Muaaz Yousef (Arabic:معاذ يوسف) (born 1 January 1984) is a Qatari footballer.

External links
 

Qatari footballers
1984 births
Living people
Al-Arabi SC (Qatar) players
Mesaimeer SC players
Al-Rayyan SC players
Al-Wakrah SC players
Al-Shahania SC players
Naturalised citizens of Qatar
Qatar Stars League players
Qatari Second Division players
Association football defenders